Pier 21 was an ocean liner terminal and immigration shed from 1928 to 1971 in Halifax, Nova Scotia, Canada. Nearly one million immigrants came to Canada through Pier 21, and it is the last surviving seaport immigration facility in Canada. The facility is often compared to the landmark American immigration gateway Ellis Island. The former immigration facility is now occupied by the Canadian Museum of Immigration, the Nova Scotia College of Art and Design as well as various retail and studio tenants.

Background
Halifax Harbour, along with Quebec City and Victoria, British Columbia were the major ports of entry for immigration to Canada in the steamship era. Pier 2 in Halifax's North End, also known as the "Deepwater Piers", was built in 1880 to process immigrants arriving on ocean liners. It also served as a major terminal for troopships and hospital ships in World War I. However, by 1913, the peak year of immigration in Canada, it was clear that the growing size of ocean liners and increase in immigration would require a larger facility. Plans were made for a new integrated ocean liner and railway facility in the South End of Halifax.

Construction
Construction was delayed by World War I and the Halifax Explosion. It was divided into Pier 20, 21, and 22, and faced a long sea wall which could handle the biggest ocean liners in operation.

The immigration facility on the second floor of the shed at Pier 21 housed the assembly hall for immigrants, as well as medical and detention quarters. Adjacent to the Pier 21 shed was a two-story, brick annex building connected to the shed by an overhead walkway. The annex contained immigration offices, customs, a railway booking office and telegraph office as well as offices for immigration charities such as the Canadian Red Cross and a restaurant where immigrants could get meals before their long train journeys west. Railway passenger platforms on both sides of the annex served five long passenger and express tracks which served Pier 21. Special immigrant passenger trains, made up of dozens of colonist cars, would take passengers from Halifax to their new homes across Canada. A second overhead walkway crossed the tracks to connect the Pier 21 terminal to the Halifax, Nova Scotia railway station where more affluent travelers could board regularly scheduled trains such as the Ocean Limited.

History 

Pier 21 opened on March 8, 1928, and the Holland America liner  became the first ship to bring immigrants to Canada through the new terminal.

Pier 21 would serve as a passenger terminal for trans-Atlantic Ocean liners from 1928 until 1971. The Pier was the primary point of entry for nearly one million immigrants and refugees from Europe and elsewhere, as well as the departure point for 496,000 military personnel Canadian troops during World War II. The facility became known informally as the 'Gateway to Canada.'

In its first years of operation, Pier 21 greeted many Dutch and English immigrants as well as workers sponsored by employers. However the Great Depression led to severe restrictions in immigration, and so arrival numbers fell. Pier 21 became a cruise ship destination during the Depression as giant liners were employed in summer recreational cruises from New York to Halifax, Nova Scotia during slack periods of Trans-Atlantic crossings.

World War II

The war almost completely halted immigration, but Pier 21 quickly became a major embarkation port for troop ships. As the war continued, a special medical embarkation unit was established at Pier 21 to move wounded soldiers from hospital ships to special hospital trains as the hospital ships Lady Nelson and  brought wounded Canadians home. Most of the over 90,000 aviators who came to Canada as part of the British Commonwealth Air Training Plan landed at Pier 21. Over 2,000 child evacuees from the United Kingdom arrived at Pier 21 during the war, fleeing the Blitz. Princess Juliana and Prince Bernhard of the Netherlands arrived at Pier 21 amidst ceremony aboard the Dutch cruiser  in 1940 after the invasion of the Netherlands, en route to wartime refuge in Ottawa. Winston Churchill passed through Pier 21 four times, traveling in 1943 and 1944 to the Quebec Conference and the Washington Conference. During the latter trip he led a sing-along of "O Canada" and "The Maple Leaf Forever" at the Pier 21 railway platform where hundreds had gathered to see him. Enormous amounts of gold bullion were secretly shipped through Pier 21 during the war to banks in Ottawa and Montreal to safeguard currency reserves of beleaguered European nations. Britain alone shipped over 2.5 billion in gold reserves in 50 different shipments codenamed variously as "margarine" or "peanuts" from 1939 to 1941. At the war's end the Pier welcomed returning troops followed by war brides. A large fire heavily damaged Pier 21 on March 5, 1944 causing the central portion of the facility to be rebuilt in time to handle returning soldiers and war brides in 1945.

Postwar

Following the war brides, several major waves of immigrants arrived at Pier 21 beginning with the Displaced Person refugees from across Europe, including many Holocaust survivors. These refugees were followed by large numbers of post war economic immigrants from several European countries such as Britain, Italy, Germany and the Netherlands.

One of the smallest ships to ever come to Pier 21, the former minesweeper  arrived in 1948 packed with 347 refugees from the Baltic, triggering a controversy about their admittance to Canada which help shaped Canada's postwar refugee policies. The 1950s marked the peak years of immigration arrivals, many of which were Italian-Canadians. A large two-story addition was built onto the immigration annex building in the 1950s to handle the heavy traffic of postwar European immigration. The Hungarian Uprising in 1956 brought another group of refugees to Pier 21, although some from this wave were now arriving by aircraft. The decline in ocean liner travel due to the rise of jet airliner travel during the 1960s caused immigration to shift to airports. With few ships calling at Pier 21, the terminal was used more often in its final years to handle overflow from airport immigration offices. The last major group of immigrants were 100 Cuban refugees from the Gander International Airport who were transferred to Pier 21 in 1970 to be accommodated while their refugee claims were processed. The last ship to bring immigrants to Pier 21 was the SS Cristoforo Colombo on March 30, 1971. Pier 21 closed its doors on March 31, 1971. A few other ships arrived in Halifax with immigrants after Pier 21 closed, but they were received by immigration officials working out of a downtown office.

Post-immigration use

From the 1970s until 1991, the former immigration facility at Pier 21 housed the Nova Scotia Nautical Institute, a training facility for professional mariners. During the 1990s, the space provided studio and workshop space for artists. 
The Immigration annex was used by customs officials and the Halifax port's police. The growth of the cruise ship industry in the 1980s led to the return of large passenger ships to the Pier 21 wharves, however only for short recreational visits. Some of the former immigration terminal areas in Shed 20 and 22 was converted in stages to cruise ship passenger reception and retail spaces.

On September 22, 1997, the Pier 21 facility was designated a National Historic Site of Canada on the recommendation of the Historic Sites and Monuments Board of Canada because of the facility's major role in 20th century immigration in Canada and because it is the last surviving seaport immigration facility in Canada. The Pier 21 Society opened an interpretive centre in part of the former immigration facility in 1999. The society became the Canadian Museum of Immigration at Pier 21 in 2010, and occupied an expanded portion of the former immigration facility. The Nova Scotia College of Art and Design's seaport campus took over Pier 21's former medical, detention and accommodation wing in 2011. The Garrison brewing company leased a large portion of the immigration annex building in May 2006. A variety of retail shops as well as artists' and architects' studios and cultural organizations occupy the remainder of the immigration annex.

In late 2005, Pier 21's Carrie-Anne Smith and Vice Admiral Duncan "Dusty" Miller contributed wood from the building's rafters to the Six String Nation project. Part of that material now forms the X-brace on the interior of Voyageur, the guitar at the heart of the project.

See also
 Eswyn Lyster – warbride author

References

Further reading
 Joyce, Sandra, The Street Arab – The Story of a British Home Child (2011) Welldone Publishing, Toronto Canada, www.sandrajoyce.com
 
  
 Schwinghamer, Steven and Jan Raska, Pier 21: A History, University of Ottawa Press (2020).

External links

 Pier 21

Piers in Canada
History of immigration to Canada
National Historic Sites in Nova Scotia
Transport buildings and structures in Nova Scotia